William d'Aubigny (d. after 1148), was an itinerant justice under King Henry I of England. He was commonly known by the appellation Brito.

William was a son of Main d'Aubigny, Breton lord of Saint-Aubin-d'Aubigné (now in Ille-et-Vilaine department) and Adelaide de Bohun, daughter of Humphrey with the Beard. He fought at the Battle of Tinchebray (1106) and was high in Henry I's favor. He was allowed to marry Cecily, the elder daughter of Roger Bigod, sheriff of Norfolk. Through her, he acquired a part of the honour of Belvoir in Leicestershire – his castle became the centre of the family estates – after his mother-in-law, who had been the heir of Robert de Todeni, lord of Belvoir, died about 1130. 

The couple had four or five sons and two daughters. His heir was William, who married Maud Fitz Robert, daughter of Robert Fitz Richard. William d'Aubigny, a Magna Carta surety, was their son – his grandson.

His daughter Matildis married Gille Brigte, Earl of Strathearn.

After the death of King Henry I in 1135, William was and remained a loyal supporter of King Stephen, who presumably confirmed him in succession of Belvoir which passed to his son William.

Notes

References 
 K. S. B. Keats-Rohan, 'Aubigné, William d' (d. in or after 1148)', Oxford Dictionary of National Biography, Oxford University Press, 2004. .

1090s births
1130s deaths
12th-century English judges
Anglo-Normans
People from the Borough of Melton
High Sheriffs of Rutland
People from Ille-et-Vilaine